Government Engineering College, Banswara is a government autonomous engineering college in Banswara, Rajasthan, India. It was established in 2012 and offers courses in different engineering branches.

It was located on the dugarpur road behind the mayur mill.
Government engineering college banswara offered engineering in three branch- Mechanical, electrical and civil. The first batch was successfully passed out in 2016. It was spread over on 50 acre lush green campus.

Engineering colleges in Rajasthan
Educational institutions established in 2012
2012 establishments in Rajasthan